The 2012 Crown Royal Presents the Curtiss Shaver 400 at the Brickyard powered by BigMachineRecords.com, the 19th running of the event, was a NASCAR Sprint Cup Series stock car race held on July 29, 2012 at the Indianapolis Motor Speedway in Speedway, Indiana. Contested over 160 laps, was the twentieth race of the 2012 NASCAR Sprint Cup Series season. Jimmie Johnson, of the Hendrick Motorsports racing team, won his third race of the season ahead of Kyle Busch in second. Greg Biffle finished in the third position.

Report

Background

Indianapolis Motor Speedway is one of six superspeedways to hold NASCAR races; the others are Michigan International Speedway, Auto Club Speedway, Daytona International Speedway, Pocono Raceway and Talladega Superspeedway. The track's turns are banked at 9 degrees, while the front stretch, the location of the finish line, has no banking. The back stretch, opposite of the front, also has none. The racetrack has seats for 250,000 spectators.

Before the race, Matt Kenseth led the Drivers' Championship with 707 points, and Dale Earnhardt Jr. stood in second with 691. Greg Biffle was third in the Drivers' Championship with 667 points, eleven ahead of Jimmie Johnson and 39 ahead of Denny Hamlin in fourth and fifth. Kevin Harvick with 622 was four ahead of Tony Stewart, as Martin Truex Jr. with 617 points, was three ahead of Clint Bowyer, and four in front of Brad Keselowski. In the Manufacturers' Championship, Chevrolet was leading with135 points, 25 ahead of Toyota. Ford, with 93 points, was thirteen points ahead of Dodge in the battle for third. Paul Menard is the defending winner of the race.

In 2011, Crown Royal announced that they would move their sponsorship from Richmond International Raceway to Indianapolis to rename the Brickyard 400 to Crown Royal "Your Hero's Name Goes Here" 400 at the Brickyard. Once the naming rights contest concluded, Curtiss Shaver, a firefighter from Troy, Alabama, was announced the winner, making the official race name for the 2012 race, the Crown Royal Curtiss Shaver 400 at the Brickyard.

Indianapolis Motor Speedway also made changes to the garages in 2012 as part of the new format of having both a first and second tier series race at the Speedway.  For the first time, the top 35 Cup teams would no longer use the traditional Gasoline Alley garages.  Instead, the top teams in points would be parked in the "new" garages located on pit road used first for Formula One and later for MotoGP.  NASCAR Inspection would be held in the pitside garages, and lower teams and the Nationwide Series (racing for the first time at Indianapolis) will use Gasoline Alley.

Practice and qualifying

Two practice sessions were held before the race on July 28, 2012. The first session was 60 minutes long, while the second was 110 minutes. Kasey Kahne was quickest with a time of 48.563 seconds in the first session, 0.478 faster than Mark Martin. Jeff Gordon was third quickest, followed by Johnson, Keselowski, and Menard. Earnhardt Jr. was seventh, still within a second of Kahne's time. In the second and final practice session, Biffle was quickest with a time of 49.587 seconds. Carl Edwards, with a time of 49.660, was second quickest, ahead of Joey Logano, Kahne, and Kenseth. Johnson, Regan Smith, Gordon, Jeff Burton, and Hamlin completed the first ten positions.

Forty-six cars were entered for qualifying, but only forty-three could qualify for the race because of NASCAR's qualifying procedure. Hamlin clinched his first pole position at Indianapolis Motor Speedway, with a time of 49.244 seconds. He was joined on the front row of the grid by Edwards. Logano qualified third, Aric Almirola took fourth, and Biffle started fifth. Johnson, Kyle Busch, Menard, Gordon and Kenseth rounded out the top ten. The drivers that failed to qualify for the race were Reed Sorenson, Joe Nemechek, Michael McDowell. McDowell's time was disallowed after his car failed inspection; Mike Bliss was awarded a spot in the field.

Once the qualifying session had concluded, Hamlin stated, "We knew this was the turning point of the season. From Indy until Richmond is when you start seeing who's going to fight for a championship. Everyone's got their Chase cars prepared, bringing them to the track, and that's when you want to start running good. Every year with six to seven races before the Chase, we start running all out to see where we stack up against the field. If this is any indication, we hope it's 2010 all over with except the ending."

Results

Qualifying

Race results

Standings after the race

Drivers' Championship standings

Manufacturers' Championship standings

Note: Only the top ten positions are included for the driver standings.

References

NASCAR races at Indianapolis Motor Speedway
Brickyard 400
Brickyard 400
Brickyard 400